Hippoglossus is a genus of very large righteye flounders with one species native to the north Atlantic Ocean and one to the north Pacific Ocean.

Etymology
The word hippoglossus is derived from the Greek ἵππος (hippos), meaning "horse", and γλῶσσα (glōssa), meaning "tongue" - a reference to the shape of the fish.

Species
There are two species in this genus:

 Hippoglossus hippoglossus (Linnaeus, 1758) (Atlantic halibut)
 Hippoglossus stenolepis P. J. Schmidt, 1904 (Pacific halibut)

References

 
Pleuronectidae
Marine fish genera
Taxa named by Georges Cuvier